Robert Ugrina (born 1974 in Zagreb) is a Croatian actor and comedian.

He is best known for his roles in the popular comedy series Bumerang (2005-2006), Zakon! (2009) and Ko te šiša (2016-2020). He has appeared in Sleep Sweet, My Darling, What Is a Man Without a Moustache? (both 2005), Metastases (2009), Josef (2011), Vegetarian Cannibal (2012) and Lavina (2017).

He is also known for an extensive stage and voice-acting career. He has provided voice-work for over a hundred animated feature films and Eugene Krabs in the Croatian-language version of SpongeBob SquarePants.

Career
He graduated from the Academy of Dramatic Arts of the University of Zagreb.

He conceived his successful comedic career on television initially for his role as Drago in Bumerang (2005-2006). After that stint, he appeared as in the memorable supporting role of Medo Bruno on Bitange i princeze.

His perhaps best-known role is the abused sidekick of Inspector Zdravko Maček (played by Stojan Matavulj) Mateo Ćirić in the controversial series Zakon! (2009) by Ivan Goran Vitez. While it was short-lived, the series has now garnered a cult following. From 2016 to 2020, he portrayed Joža, a lazy mechanic and husband of hairdresser Lili (played by Jadranka Đokić) in the commercially successful Aldo Tardozzi comedy Ko te šiša.

He also appeared in Zabranjena ljubav, Naša mala klinika, Bibin svijet, Stipe u gostima and Najbolje godine.

He has worked actively on film, performing as a leading man in Sleep Sweet, My Darling, Otac (both 2005) Metastases (2009) and Lavina (2017) and a character actor in What Is a Man Without a Moustache? (2005), Play Me a Love Song (2007), Will Not End Here (2008), Josef (2011) and Vegetarian Cannibal (2012). Lavina, screened at the 2017 Pula Film Festival, seen Ugrina star in a leading female role and gained him a Golden Arena for Best Supporting Actress nomination.

Ugrina has starred in plays in various theatres in Zagreb, Split, Požega, Varaždin and Virovitica. He has starred in plays including Vjenčani list, Radio Tesla, Brak iz računa and Sve o muškarcima.

Filmography

Television

Film

Voice-over roles

References

External links

1974 births
20th-century Croatian male actors
21st-century Croatian male actors
Croatian male film actors
Croatian male stage actors
Croatian male voice actors
Croatian male television actors
Living people
Male actors from Zagreb